Juuso Välimäki (born 6 October 1998) is a Finnish professional ice hockey defenceman for the Arizona Coyotes of the National Hockey League (NHL). He was selected by the Calgary Flames in the first round, 16th overall, in the 2017 NHL Entry Draft

Playing career
Välimäki was born in Tampere, Finland, but grew up in Nokia, Finland. Välimäki received an invitation to the Finnish Independence Day Reception in 2016.

Välimäki was selected 14th overall by the Tri-City Americans in the 2015 CHL Import draft. He played three seasons with the Americans.

He was selected by the Calgary Flames in the first round, 16th overall, in the 2017 NHL Entry Draft before signing a three-year, entry-level contract with the Calgary Flames on 21 July 2017. As a draft prospect, Välimäki was ranked 11th of North American skaters by the NHL Central Scouting Bureau,t and ranked the 14th skater by ISS Hockey.

Välimäki made his NHL debut in the 2018–19 season on 3 October 2018, against the Vancouver Canucks. He scored his first NHL goal on 17 October, the third Flames goal in a 5–2 victory over the Boston Bruins; Välimäki scored the goal on Tuukka Rask, who had lost control of the puck after initially catching a piece of Välimäki's shot. Välimäki suffered a high ankle sprain which limited his season.

After sitting out the 2019–20 season due to a torn ACL injury, and with the following North American season delayed due to the COVID-19 pandemic, Välimäki was loaned by the Flames to Finnish Liiga club, Ilves, to start the 2020–21 season on 30 September 2020. Välimäki made a successful return from injury with Ilves, playing in a top-four role and producing at a point-per-game pace through 19 regular season contests, before returning to Calgary.

Prior to the 2022–23 season, after being unable to make the Flames opening night roster, Välimäki was placed on waivers before he was claimed the following day, on 9 October 2022, by the Arizona Coyotes. Establishing a regular role within the Coyotes on the blueline, Välimäki was signed to a one-year, $1 million contract extension at the mid-point of the season on 24 January 2023.

International play

Välimäki was named to team Finland at the 2015 IIHF World U18 Championships, which eventually earned a silver medal after a 2–1 overtime loss against the United States. Välimäki finished the 2015 tournament with 1 assist in 7 games. The following year Välimäki was named captain and led Finland to the gold medal at 2016 IIHF World U18 Championships defeating Sweden 6–1. Välimäki finished the 2016 World Championship with two assists in six games.

Välimäki was named to team Finland in the 2017 World Junior Ice Hockey Championships, scoring two goals in six games as Finland finished with only one win in the tournament. In December 2017, Välimäki was named captain of Team Finland at the 2018 World Junior Ice Hockey Championships. Finland was subsequently eliminated in the quarterfinals against the Czech Republic with a final score of 4–1, and Välimäki finished the 2018 World Juniors with one goal and three assists in six games.

Career statistics

Regular season and playoffs

International

Awards and honours

References

External links
 

1998 births
Living people
Arizona Coyotes players
Calgary Flames draft picks
Calgary Flames players
Finnish expatriate ice hockey players in Canada
Finnish expatriate ice hockey players in the United States
Finnish ice hockey defencemen
Ilves players
National Hockey League first-round draft picks
People from Nokia, Finland
Stockton Heat players
Sportspeople from Pirkanmaa
Tri-City Americans players